Lower may refer to:

Lower (surname)
Lower Township, New Jersey
Lower Receiver (firearms)
Lower Wick Gloucestershire, England

See also
Nizhny